Faulkbourne Hall is a Grade 1 listed manor house in the village of Faulkbourne in Essex. It is the centre of the manor of Faulkbourne, first recorded under Edward the Confessor. Its grounds contain the parish church, which is dedicated to Saint Germanus.

The earliest surviving parts of Faulkbourne Hall, a red-bricked building with turrets, date from the 15th century. Sir Edward Bullock purchased the Hall and the manor of Faulkbourne in 1637 and made substantial additions to the building. Further extensions were made in the 19th century. 

The Hall is considered a fine specimen of early Tudor red-brick design. Its exterior holds a number of metalled vanes in the form of flags bearing the initials of the Bullock family, which owned the Hall from 1637 to 1897.

See also
 Bullock family
 Sir Edward Bullock
 Colonel John Bullock

References

Country houses in Essex
Manor houses in England
Grade I listed buildings in Essex